Stidzaeras strigifera is a moth in the family Erebidae. It was described by Herbert Druce in 1905. It is found in Venezuela and Peru.

Subspecies
Stidzaeras strigifera strigifera (Venezuela)
Stidzaeras strigifera ockendeni Rothschild, 1910 (Peru)

References

Moths described in 1905
Phaegopterina
Moths of South America